The Fauvel AV.3 (AV for aile volante was a flying wing glider built in France in the early 1930s.

Specifications

References

Tailless aircraft
Flying wings
1930s French sailplanes
Fauvel aircraft
Glider aircraft
Aircraft first flown in 1933